

Events 
Wolfgang Amadeus Mozart resigns his position in the Salzburg court.
Samuel Arnold becomes musical director of the Haymarket Theatre in London.
Über die Theorie der Musik by Johann Nikolaus Forkel is published in Göttingen.
Thomas Arne and his wife are reconciled after a separation of over twenty years.

Opera 
Agostino Accorimboni – Nitteti
Luigi de Baillou – Il casino di campagna
Domenico Cimarosa 
L'Armida immaginaria
Il fanatico per gli antichi romani
I tre amanti
Christoph Willibald Gluck – Armide
Joseph Haydn – Il mondo della luna
Elizabeth Ryves – The Prude

Classical music 
Carl Philipp Emanuel Bach – 4 Keyboard Trios, Wq.91
Johann Christian Bach – 6 Keyboard Concertos, Op. 13
Johann Christoph Friedrich Bach – Flute Sonata No.1 in D major
Charles Burney – 4 Sonatas for Keyboard 4-Hands
Giuseppe Maria Cambini – 6 Flute Quintets, Op. 8
Michael Haydn – Missa S Hieronymi
Gottfried August Homilius – Christmas Oratorio
John Keeble – Diapason Movement in F major
 Wolfgang Amadeus Mozart – Piano Concerto No. 9 ("Jeunehomme")
Josef Mysliveček – Isacco figura del redentore (oratorio)
Antonio Salieri – La Passione di Gesu Christo
Joseph Bologne Saint-Georges – 2 Symphonies concertantes, Op. 9
Carl Stamitz 
6 Symphonies, Op. 13
Clarinet Concerto No.2 in B-flat major
Johann Baptist Wanhal – Violin Concerto in B-flat major

Popular Music
 "A-Hunting We Will Go" w.m. Thomas Arne (written for insertion into a London production of The Beggar's Opera and first sung by the contralto Mrs. Farrell playing Captain Macheath (sic.))

Methods and theory writings 

 Johann Nikolaus Forkel – Über die Theorie der Musik
 Johann Caspar Heck – The Art of Playing Thorough Bass
 Valentin Roeser – Gamme et 12 Duo pour la Flûte Traversière

Births 
January 1 – Micah Hawkins, composer
January 3 – Louis Poinsot, instrument maker
January 8 – Filippo Traetta, musicologist
January 12 – Stepan Davydov, Russian composer (died 1825)
April 18 – Ignac Ruzitska, composer
May 4 – Charles-Louis-Joseph Hanssens, composer
May 8 – Mateli Magdalena Kuivalatar, Finnish-Carelian Folksinger
May 12 – Giovanni Morandi, Italian composer (died 1856)
May 28 – Joseph-Henri-Ignace Mees, composer
June 2 – Christian Traugott Tag, composer
September 30 – Ramon Felix Cuellar y Altarriba, composer
October 3 – Hedda Hjortsberg, ballerina
October 6 – William Russell, organist and composer
November 5 – Filippo Taglioni, dancer and choreographer
December 16 – János Fusz, composer

Deaths 
January 1 – Emanuele Barbella, composer
January 22 – Simon Leduc, composer violinist (born 1742)
March 1 – Georg Christoph Wagenseil
July 27 – William Hayes, composer (b. 1708)
August 17 – Giuseppe Scarlatti, composer
August 23 – Giuseppe Sellitti, composer
September 1 – Johann Ernst Bach, composer
November – Marco Coltellini, opera librettist (b. 1724)
November 30 – Jean-Marie Leclair the younger, composer (b. 1703)
December 21 – Anton Cajetan Adlgasser, organist (b. 1729) 

 
18th century in music
Music by year